Bangabandhu Military Museum is a military museum of Bangladesh. Administered by the Bangladesh Army, the museum is located right beside the Bangabandhu Sheikh Mujibur Rahman Novo Theatre at Bijoy Sarani of the capital Dhaka. The museum has a collection of Bangladesh's military history, heritage, success stories and various weapons and ammunition.

History
The museum was established in 1987. It was permanently moved in its current location at Bijoy Sarani in 1999. It has a collection of vehicles and weapons rescued from the then Pakistani army after the Liberation war of Bangladesh.

Design and layout
The museum is a joint venture project of, Ali Imam (Architect), Nakshabid Architects (an architectural consultancy firm), Design Work Group (DWG), Mukta Dinwiddie Maclaren Architects (MDM) combinedly worked on the museums interior and exterior.

The museum is divided in to six sections, including the Bangladesh History Gallery on the ground floor, Bangladesh Army Gallery on the 2nd floor, Bangladesh Air Force gallery on the 3rd floor, UN Peacekeeping Gallery on the 4th floor, and Bangladesh Navy Gallery at the basement.

There is also a separate museum named "Toshakhana Jadughor" within the museum complex, where gifts and awards received by the country's important personnel are showcased.

There is also a grand sculpture in the middle of the "Toshakhana Jadughor" and all the artefacts see showcased around it in a corkscrew pattern.

The museum also has a wide implementation of Augmented Reality, Interactive Displays, Virtual Reality, Holograms etc.

Gallery

References 

Museums established in 1987
Museums in Dhaka
History museums in Bangladesh